Chorrillos is a city and middle-class suburb of Lima, the capital city of Peru. Chorrillos has a hot desert climate (BWh) according to the Köppen climate classification and two of Lima's most popular public beaches called Agua Dulce and La Herradura, therefore since its establishment from a village beach resort in 1824, to a town in 1856, to a city in 1901, it became one of Lima's most popular tourist destinations, along with its district. However, along with the rest of Lima, Chorrillos is prone to natural disasters, especially earthquakes: for example, in 1940, Chorrillos received a major earthquake that rendered enormous damages to some of Chorrillos' private clubs and infrastructures, and a military history, when during the War of the Pacific, it was sacked and burned by Chilean Forces; along with this, Chorrillos also contains Peru's national military school.

References 

Cities in Peru